The 2016 Northeast Conference baseball tournament began on May 26 and ended on May 28 at Senator Thomas J. Dodd Memorial Stadium in Norwich, Connecticut.  The league's top four teams finishers competed in the double elimination tournament.   won their third tournament championship in four years to earn the Northeast Conference's automatic bid to the 2016 NCAA Division I baseball tournament.

Entering the event, Central Connecticut and defending champion Sacred Heart had won the most tournament championships among current members, while Fairleigh Dickinson and LIU Brooklyn had never won a championship.

Seeding and format
The top four finishers were seeded one through four based on conference regular season winning percentage.  They will then play a double-elimination tournament.

Bracket

All-Tournament Team
The following players were named to the All-Tournament Team.

Most Valuable Player
Cole Fabio was named Tournament Most Valuable Player.  Fabio was a junior second baseman who recorded four hits, four walks, three RBI and a tournament-high seven runs scored in the event.

References

Tournament
Northeast Conference Baseball Tournament
Northeast Conference baseball tournament
Northeast Conference baseball tournament